Jungwon-gu is a district (gu), in Seongnam, Gyeonggi-do, South Korea.

References

Districts of Seongnam